Ian "Beaser" Aitken (born 16 May 1967) is a former Australian rules footballer who played for Carlton and St Kilda in the Victorian Football League (VFL).

Aitken was a strongly built and pacy defender, winning the Rookie of the Year award in his debut season in 1987. He was also a premiership player that year. He moved to St Kilda for the 1993 season but only managed 5 games.

He was the founder of Vic Cric in 1993, a program for young children learning skills in cricket and how to play the game.  Aitken was also the founder of Vic Footy, an Australian Rules Football program similar to Vic Cricket. 

He is currently the coach of the Yarra Junior Football League team, Kew Colts Kangaroos and Kew Rovers. He is also a great contributor to these club in all respects.

External links

1967 births
Living people
Australian rules footballers from Victoria (Australia)
Carlton Football Club players
Carlton Football Club Premiership players
St Kilda Football Club players
Strathmore Football Club players
One-time VFL/AFL Premiership players